The following lists events that happened during 1974 in Laos.

Incumbents
Monarch: Savang Vatthana 
Prime Minister: Souvanna Phouma

Events

Births
30 January - Siluck Saysanasy

References

 
1970s in Laos
Years of the 20th century in Laos
Laos
Laos